The 2021–22 season was FC Desna Chernihiv's 61st season in existence and the club's fourth consecutive season in the top flight of Ukrainian football. In summer of 2021 the club fails to qualify for the cups and according with the president of the club, Volodymyr Levin, said that the club has a 4-month debt to the players for the payment of salaries and the management of the UPL club decided to cut the budget for the 2021/22 season. A number of players have left Desna. The club begins the rejuvenation of the team, leaving starting players who have made the history of the club and begins to develop the team's academy and choose some of Desna 2 and Desna 3 players. On 15 July 2021 the cooperation with the sponsor Parimatch was extended. In summer 2021, the team was requalified and new young players has been added into the club with good results at the first four matches in Ukrainian Premier League.

Players

Squad information

Transfers

In

Out

Pre-season and friendlies

Competitions

Overall
{| class="wikitable" style="text-align:center; width:730px;"
|-
! style="text-align:center; width:150px;" | Competition
! style="text-align:center; width:200px;" | Started round
! style="text-align:center; width:100px;" | Current  position
! style="text-align:center; width:100px;" | Final  position
! style="text-align:center; width:150px;" | First match
! style="text-align:center; width:150px;" | Last match
|-
| style="text-align:left;" | Premier League
| Matchday 1
| —
| —
|  25 July 2021
|  21 April 2022
|-
| style="text-align:left;" | Cup
| Round of 16
| Round of 32 (1/16)
| Round of 32 (1/16)
|  September 2021
|  September 2021
|-

Overview

{| class="wikitable" style="text-align: center"
|-
!rowspan=2|Competition
!colspan=8|Record
|-
!
!
!
!
!
!
!
!
|-
| Premier League

|-
| Cup

|-
! Total

Ukrainian Premier League

League table

Results by round

Results

Ukrainian Cup

Statistics

Appearances and goals

|-
! colspan=16 style=background:#dcdcdc; text-align:center| Goalkeepers 

|-
! colspan=16 style=background:#dcdcdc; text-align:center| Defenders

 	

|-
! colspan=16 style=background:#dcdcdc; text-align:center| Midfielders 

 

|-
! colspan=16 style=background:#dcdcdc; text-align:center| Forwards

|-
! colspan=16 style=background:#dcdcdc; text-align:center| Players transferred out during the season
 

 	

 
Last updated: 7 April 2022

Goalscorers

Last updated: 10 December 2021

Clean sheets

Last updated: 27 November 2021

Disciplinary record

Last updated: 10 December 2021

References

External links

FC Desna Chernihiv
FC Desna Chernihiv seasons
Desna Chernihiv